The 1941 Carnegie Tech Tartans football team was an American football team that represented the Carnegie Institute of Technology—now known as Carnegie Mellon University—as an independent during the 1941 college football season.  In Edward Baker's second year as head coach, the Tartans compiled a 1–7 record, concurrent with their recent de-emphasis of football, and were outscored 148 to 37, including no points in their final three contests.

Schedule

References

Carnegie Tech
Carnegie Mellon Tartans football seasons
Carnegie Tech Tartans football